Bartonella doshiae is a bacterium. As with other Bartonella species, it can cause disease in animals.

See also
Bartonella taylorii
Bartonella grahamii
Bartonella peromysci
Bartonella talpae

References

External links
Bartonella-Associated Infections – CDC
Bartonella species - List of Prokaryotic names with Standing in Nomenclature
Bartonella talpae on Culture Collection, University of Göteborg, Sweden
Type strain of Bartonella doshiae at BacDive -  the Bacterial Diversity Metadatabase

Bartonellaceae
Bacteria described in 1995